Rubrograptis is a genus of moths belonging to the family Tortricidae.

Species
Rubrograptis recrudescentia Razowski, 1981

Former species
Rubrograptis praeconia (Meyrick, 1937)

See also
List of Tortricidae genera

References

 , 2005: World Catalogue of Insects vol. 5 Tortricidae.
  1981: Acta zool. cracov. 25: 328.
 , 2005: Notes and descriptions of primitive Tortricini from Tropical Africa, with a list of Asian taxa (Lepidoptera: Tortricidae). SHILAP Revista de Lepidopterología 33 (132): 423–436. .

External links
Tortricid.net

Tortricini
Tortricidae genera